Heilige oder Dirne is a 1929 German silent film directed by Martin Berger and starring María Corda, Vladimir Gajdarov and Hans Adalbert Schlettow.

The film's sets were designed by Otto Guelstorff.

Cast
 Marcel Vibert as Raoul
 Hilde von Stolz as Therese
 María Corda as Lydia, Thereses Freundin
 Gertrud Eysoldt as Raouls Mutter
 Hans Adalbert Schlettow as Gonsalez, Plantagenbesitzer
 Lee Abère as Gonsalezs Frau
 Hans Albers as Varnesi
 Paul Otto as Dr. Abrisni, Bankier
 Mikhail Rasumny
 Erika Dannhoff
 Vladimir Gajdarov

References

Bibliography
 Michaela Krützen. Hans Albers: eine deutsche Karriere. Beltz Quadriga, 1995.

External links

1929 films
Films of the Weimar Republic
German silent feature films
Films directed by Martin Berger
Films based on works by Georges Ohnet
German black-and-white films